The mixed doubles tournament at the 1988 French Open was held from 23 May until 5 June 1988 on the outdoor clay courts at the Stade Roland Garros in Paris, France. Lori McNeil and Jorge Lozano won the title, defeating Brenda Schultz and Michiel Schapers in the final.

Draw

Finals

Top half

Section 1

Section 2

Bottom half

Section 3

Section 4

External links
1988 French Open – Doubles draws and results at the International Tennis Federation

Mixed Doubles
French Open by year – Mixed doubles